Krakow is an unincorporated community and census-designated place located primarily in Shawano County, Wisconsin, United States, with a small portion in Oconto County. Krakow is located on Wisconsin Highway 32 north of Pulaski, in the towns of Chase, and Angelica. Krakow has a post office with ZIP code 54137. As of the 2010 census, its population is 354.  Krakow has a Catholic Church and a tavern. In its heyday, Krakow had a grocery store, cheese factory, pickle canning company, movie theaters, and a few taverns, a parochial and a public schools.

Demographics

References

Census-designated places in Oconto County, Wisconsin
Census-designated places in Shawano County, Wisconsin
Census-designated places in Wisconsin